D. salicifolia may refer to:
 Dinoseris salicifolia, a plant species in the Asteraceae
 Dipholis salicifolia, a plant species in the Sapotaceae
 Duguetia salicifolia, a plant species in the Annonaceae

See also 
 Salicifolia (disambiguation)